Mille-Isles is a municipality in the Laurentides region of Quebec, Canada, part of the Argenteuil Regional County Municipality, west of Saint-Jérôme.

Mille-Isles is in the Laurentian Hills, crossed by rivers and dotted with fish-filled lakes.

History
The municipality is named after the old Mille-Isles Seigneury, which originally straddled the Mille Îles River (the seigneury uses the old spelling, whereas the river uses the modern word that substitutes a circumflex for the "s"). In 1683, the seigneury was granted to Michel-Sidrac Dugué de Boisbriand (circa 1638-1688), who was governor of Montreal in 1670. In 1714, it was inherited by Charles-Gaspard Piot de Langloiserie (circa 1655-1715) and Jean Petit (1663-1720), husbands of Marie-Thérèse Dugué and Charlotte Dugué respectively, daughters of the first lord. In 1752, additional land in the extreme north-west of the Mille-Isles Seigneury was given to Eustache Lambert Dumont and it is within this part that the municipality is located.

The first settlers were from Ireland and arrived around 1850. The municipality was officially founded in 1855, following separation from the parish of Saint-Jérôme.

Demographics

Mother tongue:
 English as first language: 28%
 French as first language: 69%
 English and French as first language: 1%
 Other as first language: 2%

Local government
List of former mayors:

 Richard Cyr (... –2005)
 John Carson Collins (2005–2009)
 Yvon Samson (2009–2013)
 Michel Boyer (2013–2017
 Howard Sauvé (2017–present)

Education

The Commission scolaire de la Rivière-du-Nord (CSRDN) operates Francophone public schools:
 École primaire Bellefeuille in Saint-Jérôme
 École secondaire Émilien-Frenette in Saint-Jérôme and École polyvalente Lavigne in Lachute

Sir Wilfrid Laurier School Board operates English-language public schools. Schools serving the town:
 Morin Heights Elementary School in Morin-Heights serves most of the town
 Laurentia Elementary School in Saint-Jérôme serves a portion of the town
 Laurentian Regional High School in Lachute

See also
List of municipalities in Quebec

References

External links

Incorporated places in Laurentides
Municipalities in Quebec